Resto del Mundo is an Argentine television program, broadcast by El Trece since March 28, 2004, which provides tourist analyzes of places in the world.
Produced by the brothers Pablo and Hernán Valenzuela, and hosted by Emilia Attias, RDM has had 17 seasons and 703 episodes, in which it has visited 101 countries and 679 cities.

History 

Resto del Mundo is a cultural, travel program that stands out for its modern and avant-garde edition, as well as high quality production.
Travel the most remote and eccentric destinations on the planet, showing unparalleled landscapes and historical settings of the world reserved for the chosen ones.
Throughout its 17 years, it had several conductors such as Sergio Goycochea, Iván de Pineda, Liz Solari and currently Emilia Attias.

Awards
 2016 Martín Fierro Award
 Best cultural program
 2017 Martín Fierro Award 
 Male driving work (nominees)
 2019 Fund TV Award 
 Honorable mention (15 years)
 2020 Fund TV Award 
 General interest - Producers or broadcasters (nominees)

References

El Trece original programming